Tamara Griesser Pečar (born 18 March 1947) is a Slovenian historian.

Early life and education
She was born in Ljubljana, then part of the Socialist Federal Republic of Yugoslavia. She attended high school in Ljubljana, Koper and Portorož and later in New York City and in Vienna. After graduating from the American International School of Vienna, she studied history at the American University of Paris and later history and English at the University of Vienna, where she obtained her PhD in 1973 with a dissertation on the positions of the Slovenian autonomous government towards Carinthia and Carinthian Slovenes between 1918 and 1920.

Literary career
She has written on the dissolution of Austria-Hungary, on the position of the Roman Catholic Church in Communist Slovenia and on the period of World War II in Slovenia. In 2003, she published a book in German entitled "The Divided Nation. Slovenia 1941–1945: Occupation, Collaboration, Civil War and Revolution". The Slovene translation was published in 2006 by the publishing house Mladinska knjiga, becoming a bestseller.
 
 . (COBISS)
  . Amalthea Verlag, Dunaj, 1988. (COBISS)
 . (COBISS)
 . (COBISS)
 . (COBISS)
 . [COBISS.SI-ID 247561984] Soavtorji: Marija Čipić Rehar, France M. Dolinar, Blaž Otrin, Julijana Visočnik.
  . 
  ), in: Studia Carinthiaca, Band XXX, Mohorjeva/Hermagoras, Klagenfurt/Celovec - Ljubljana/Laibach - Wien/Dunaj, 2010. [COBISS=1047429]
 . [COBISS.SI-ID 1135749]

Awards
In 2004, she was awarded the Pro Ecclesia et Pontifice order by Pope John Paul II.

References

20th-century Slovenian historians
Writers from Ljubljana
Slovenian Roman Catholics
1947 births
Living people
American University of Paris alumni
University of Vienna alumni
21st-century Slovenian historians